Shadow Warriors or Shadow Warrior may refer to:

 Shadow Warriors: Inside the Special Forces, a 2002 book by Tom Clancy
 Shadow Warriors (1996 book), a book by William B. Breuer
 Shadow Warriors, a book by Kenneth R. Timmerman
 Kage no Gundan: Hattori Hanzo a.k.a. Shadow Warriors, a film precursor to the 1980 TV series
 Shadow Warriors (TV series), a 1980 Japanese TV series starring Sonny Chiba
 Shadow Warriors (band), a side-project by Sam Totman of DragonForce
 Shadow Warrior, a first-person shooter video game series
 Shadow Warrior (1997 video game), the first game in the series
 Shadow Warrior (2013 video game), a reboot of the series
 Kagemusha (Shadow Warrior), a 1980 film directed by Akira Kurosawa
 Shadow Warriors (arcade), a European name of Ninja Gaiden arcade game
 Shadow Warriors (NES video game), a European name of Ninja Gaiden video game for Nintendo Entertainment System
 Shadow Warriors (Game Boy video game), a European name of Ninja Gaiden Shadow video game for Game Boy
 "Shadow Warriors", the nickname of a United States Air Force network squadron

See also

shadow war (disambiguation)
Legend of the Shadow Warriors, a single-player roleplaying gamebook